Armando Villarreal (born 1985 or 1986) is an American soccer referee. He has officiated in Major League Soccer since 2012 and was added to the FIFA International Referees List in 2015.

Biography
Villarreal began refereeing at the age of 18, when a league in which he played in Brownsville, Texas needed volunteers for under-5 matches. He then took a United States Soccer Federation (USSF) course to qualify for grade 8 as a referee, and began officiating around Texas. 

After working as a fourth official in Major League Soccer (MLS), Villarreal was referee for his first game in the competition on May 24, 2012 between the New York Red Bulls and Chivas USA. He officiated in the 2014 U.S. Open Cup Final, which Seattle Sounders FC won against the Philadelphia Union. In the 2015 MLS Cup Playoffs, he admitted after the game to making an incorrect decision in allowing Dilly Duka of the Montreal Impact to score from an offside position against the Columbus Crew, who nonetheless won in overtime. He officiated in the final of the 2016 USL Playoffs and was chosen for MLS Cup 2021 between the Portland Timbers and New York City FC.

Villarreal's first international match was on May 29, 2011 in a 2–2 friendly tie between El Salvador and Honduras in Houston. He was added to the FIFA International Referees List in 2015. He was chosen for the CONCACAF Gold Cup in 2017, 2019 and 2021, as well as the Copa América Centenario also in the United States. He was one of 24 Video Assistant Referees (VAR) chosen for the 2022 FIFA World Cup.

References

1980s births
Living people
People from Brownsville, Texas
American soccer referees